The 2017 Dublin Senior Hurling Championship is the 130th staging of the Dublin Senior Hurling Championship since its establishment by the Dublin County Board in 1887. The championship began on 27 April 2017 and ends in October 2017.

Cuala were the defending champions defeating Kilmacud Crokes in the 2016 final.

Group stage

Group A

Round 1

Round 2

Round 3

Group B

Round 1

Round 2

Round 3

Group C

Round 1

Round 2

Round 3

Group D

Round 1

Round 2

Round 3

Knockout stage

Quarter-finals

Semi-finals

Final

References

Dublin Senior Hurling Championship
Dublin Senior Hurling Championship